Rik Massengale (born February 6, 1947) is a former American professional golfer who played full-time on the PGA Tour from 1970–1982.

Massengale was born and raised in Jacksboro, Texas. He developed an interest in golf as a result of his older brother, Don, being a professional golfer. He attended the University of Texas at Austin and was a member of the golf team from 1965 to 1969. Massengale was known as a "wild man" at fraternity parties in college; however, he changed his ways and became a born-again Christian in 1975. He turned pro in 1969 and joined the PGA Tour in 1970.

Massengale won three events on the PGA Tour during the mid-1970s. His first win was at the 1975 Tallahassee Open. His second came a year later at the Sammy Davis Jr.-Greater Hartford Open. The biggest win of his career came in 1977 at the Bob Hope Desert Classic; he established a new tournament record (337) breaking Arnold Palmer's 17-year-old record by one stroke. Massengale shot a blistering 64 on the first day and led this event wire-to-wire. He led wire to wire in all three of his PGA Tour victories. His best career year was 1977 when he had seven top-10 finishes, $126,736 in earnings, and finished 13th on the money list. His best finish in a major was a T-3 at the 1977 Masters.

A back injury led Massengale to retire from the PGA Tour in 1983. He served as National Director for College Golf Fellowship for 15 years. After turning 50 in 1997, he played in a limited number of tournaments on the Senior PGA Tour (now known as the Champions Tour). His best finish in this venue was a T-6 at the 1997 Cadillac NFL Golf Classic.

Today Massengale is a commercial real estate broker in the Dallas metroplex. He married his college sweetheart, Cindy, in 1969. They have four grown children named John, Jake, Jessica and Ashlee and 13 grandchildren. They live in the Dallas suburb of Frisco, Texas. He is chairman of the Board of Chin Community Ministry, a refugee ministry in the Dallas area and serves on the board of Search Ministries Collin County. He plays golf at TPC Craig Ranch and occasionally shoots his age.

Amateur wins
1964 Texas-Oklahoma Junior Golf Tournament
1967 Cotton States Invitational
1968 Western Amateur, Southwest Conference Championship (individual medalist)

Professional wins (3)

PGA Tour wins (3)

PGA Tour playoff record (0–1)

Results in major championships

WD = withdrew
CUT = missed the half-way cut
"T" indicates a tie for a place

See also 

 1970 PGA Tour Qualifying School graduates

References

External links

 The Massengale Group Website

American male golfers
Texas Longhorns men's golfers
PGA Tour golfers
PGA Tour Champions golfers
Golfers from Texas
People from Jacksboro, Texas
People from Frisco, Texas
1947 births
Living people